Damjan may refer to:

 Damjan Bohar (born 1991), Slovenian footballer
 Damjan Daničić (born 2000), Serbian footballer
 Damjan Đoković (born 1990), Croatian footballer who also holds Dutch citizenship
 Damjan Dostanić (born 2001), Serbian footballer
 Damjan Fras (born 1973), Slovenian ski jumper
 Damjan Gajser (born 1975), Slovenian football midfielder
 Damjan Gojkov (born 1998), Serbian footballer
 Damjan Knežević (born 2000), Serbian footballer
 Damjan Kozole (born 1964), Slovenian film director
 Damjan Ljubibratić (fl. 1596–1614), Serbian Orthodox monk and diplomat
 Damjan Ošlaj (born 1976), football defender
 Damjan Ostojič (born 1986), Slovenian figure skater
 Damjan Pavlović (born 2001), Serbian footballer
 Damjan Pejčinoski (born 1984), Macedonian guitarist
 Damjan Petek (born 1973), Slovenian judoka
 Damjan Prelovšek (born 1945), Yugoslav slalom canoeist who competed in the early 1970s
 Damjan Rudež (born 1986), Croatian basketball player
 Damjan Shishkovski (born 1995), Macedonian footballer
 Damjan Sitar (born 1981), Slovenian decathlete
 Damjan Stojanovski (born 1987), Macedonian basketball player
 Damjan Štrbac (1917–1941), Serbian Orthodox priest and saint
 Damjan Trifković (born 1987), Slovenian footballer
 Damjan Vuklišević (born 1995), Slovenian footballer
 Damjan Zlatnar (born 1977), Slovenian hurdler

Serbian masculine given names
Slovene masculine given names